The 1955 NCAA Wrestling Championships were the 25th NCAA Wrestling Championships to be held. Cornell University in Ithaca, New York hosted the tournament at Barton Hall.

Oklahoma A&M took home the team championship with 40 points and having two individual champions.

Eddie Eichelberger of Lehigh was named the Most Outstanding Wrestler.

Team results

Individual finals

References 

NCAA Division I Wrestling Championship
Wrestling competitions in the United States
NCAA Wrestling Championships
NCAA Wrestling Championships
NCAA Wrestling Championships